Nerita Picea, also called Black Nerite or Pipipi in Hawaiian, is a species of marine gastropod mollusc in the family Neritidae commonly found in clusters on the high part of the intertidal zone. This species is found all through out the Hawaiian coastline and is endemic to the Hawaiian Islands. In Hawai‘i black nerite are enjoyed as a snack when boiled.

Description 
Nerita picea is a marine snail with an ovate shaped shell that is dark blue to black in color on the outside and internally white. Nerita picea range in size from 5-20mm when mature. Nerita picea have a rather solid calcareous shell with little ridges that gives texture to the shell.

Distribution 
Nerita picea is a species endemic to the Hawaiian Islands.

Habitat 
The habitat of Black Nerite consists of the higher sections of the intertidal zone usually found in clusters in the crevices and pockets of the rocky shoreline.

Human use 
In Hawaiian culture, Nerita picea or Pipipi are often eaten boiled, as part of a soup, or eaten raw.

References 

 Hombron, J.B. & Jacquinot, C.H. (1842-1854). Atlas d'histoire Naturelle zoologie par MM. Hombron et Jacquinot, chirurgiens de l'expédition. Voyage au Pole Sud et dans l'Océanie sur les corvettes l'Astrolabe et la Zélée éxecuté par ordre du roi pendant les années 1837–1838–1839–1840 sous le commandement de M. Dumont-d'Urville, capitaine de vaisseau, publié sous les auspices du département de la marine et sous la direction supérieure de M. Jacquinot, capitaine de vaisseau, commandant de la Zélée. Zoologie. Gide & Cie, Paris.

External links
  Reeve, L. A. (1855-1856). Monograph of the genus Neritina. In: Conchologia Iconica, or, illustrations of the shells of molluscous animals, vol. 9, pls 1-37 and unpaginated text. L. Reeve & Co., London

Neritidae
Gastropods described in 1841
Molluscs of Hawaii